The Hoyt Limestone is a geologic formation in New York. It preserves fossils of the Cambrian period.

See also

 List of fossiliferous stratigraphic units in New York

References
 

Cambrian geology of New York (state)
Cambrian southern paleotemperate deposits